Mid Argyll Community Hospital is a community hospital in Blarbuie Road, Lochgilphead, Scotland. It is managed by NHS Highland.

History
The facility has its origins in an infectious diseases hospital, designed by Speirs & Co. and completed in 1897. The hospital joined the National Health Service in 1948. New facilities were procured under a Private Finance Initiative contract in 2004. The new building, which was designed by HLM Architects and built by Balfour Beatty at a cost of £19.2 million, opened in 2007.

References

NHS Scotland hospitals
1897 establishments in Scotland
Hospitals established in 1897
Hospitals in Argyll and Bute
Hospital buildings completed in 2007